The Yachting Association of India (YAI) is the governing body for sailing, windsurfing, motor boating, powerboat racing and personal water craft, at sea and on inland waters in India. Legally, it is a non-profit association registered under the Societies Registration Act, 1861. The YAI was founded on 15 May 1960 and legally registered on 22 December 1964 at Calcutta, West Bengal. The YAI is affiliated to World Sailing, the world governing body for the sport of sailing, and is also officially recognized by the Indian Olympic Association and the Ministry of Youth Affairs and Sports.

Sardar Surjit Singh Majithia, Deputy Defence Minister, served as the YAI's first President. Majithia, and the YAI's third President, Indian Army Lt. Gen. Jayanto Nath Chaudhuri are the only YAI Presidents to not come from the Indian Navy. Since Admiral A.K. Chatterji became President of the YAI in April 1966, the Chief of the Naval Staff has served as YAI President.

References

Yachting associations
1960 establishments in Delhi
Organisations based in Delhi
Sports organizations established in 1960
Sports governing bodies in India
Sailing in India